|-
| Đakovići
| Goražde
|
|-
| Đakovići
| Čajniče
|
|-
| Đedići
| Trebinje
|
|-
| Đedovci
| Sokolac
|
|-
| Đedovići
| Rogatica
| Republika Srpska
|-
| Đeče
| Bileća
|
|-
| Đeđevo
| Foča
|
|-
| Đipi
| Višegrad
|
|-
| Đulići
| Zvornik
|
|-
| Đuličan
| Glamoč
|
|-
| Đulovići
| Donji Vakuf
|
|-
| Đumezlije
| Jajce
|
|-
| Đurevići
| Višegrad
|
|}

Lists of settlements in the Federation of Bosnia and Herzegovina (A-Ž)